Seals may refer to:

 Pinniped, a diverse group of semi-aquatic marine mammals, many of which are commonly called seals, particularly:
 Earless seal, or "true seal"
 Fur seal
 Seal (emblem), a device to impress an emblem, used as a means of authentication, on paper, wax, clay or another medium (the impression is also called a seal)  
 Seal (mechanical), a device which helps prevent leakage, contain pressure, or exclude contamination where two systems join

In military:
 United States Navy SEALs, the U.S. Navy's principal special operations force
 Royal Thai Navy SEALs, part of the Royal Thai Navy

In sport:
 Florida Seals, a minor league ice hockey team from 2002 and 2007
 California Golden Seals, originally California Seals, a former NHL ice hockey team
 San Francisco Seals (baseball), a minor league baseball team in the Pacific Coast League from 1903 until 1957
 San Francisco Seals (ice hockey), a minor league hockey team in the Western Hockey League from 1961 until 1967
 San Francisco Seals (soccer), an American soccer team in the USL Premier Development League from 1992 until 2008
 Victoria Seals, a professional baseball team based in Victoria, British Columbia from 2008 until 2010
San Diego Seals, a professional box lacrosse team in the National Lacrosse League

Places:
 Seals, Georgia, United States
 Seal's Rock, Lundy, Devonshire, England

Other:
 Seals (surname)
 "SEALS", the South East Academic Libraries System
 "Seals", an episode of the television series Teletubbies
 Southeast Asian Linguistics Society (SEALS)

See also 
 Seal (disambiguation)
 Seale (disambiguation)
 Seven seals (disambiguation)
 Sealing (disambiguation)
 Seals and Crofts, American music duo
 Seals of the U.S. states, their insignia